The 1987 Icelandic Cup was the 28th edition of the National Football Cup.

It took place between 27 May 1987 and 30 August 1987, with the final played at Laugardalsvöllur in Reykjavik. The cup was important, as winners qualified for the UEFA Cup Winners' Cup (if a club won both the league and the cup, the defeated finalists would take their place in the Cup Winners' Cup).

The 10 clubs from the 1. Deild entered in the last 16, with clubs from lower tiers entering in the three preliminary rounds. Teams played one-legged matches. In case of a draw, a penalty shoot-out took place (there were no replays, unlike in previous years).

Fram Reykjavik won their sixth Icelandic Cup, beating Víðir Garður in the final, and so qualifying for Europe.

First round

Second round

Third round

Fourth round 

 Entry of ten teams from the 1. Deild

Quarter finals

Semi finals

Final 

 Fram Reykjavik won their sixth Icelandic Cup, and qualified for the 1988–89 European Cup Winners' Cup.

See also 

 1987 Úrvalsdeild
 Icelandic Men's Football Cup

External links 
  1987 Icelandic Cup results at the site of the Icelandic Football Federation

Icelandic Men's Football Cup
Iceland
1987 in Iceland